The Kuomintang Youth League, also known as Young KMT, is a youth group under the Kuomintang. The Kuomintang Youth League was created in 2006 by Kuomintang chairman Ma Ying-jeou to help promote cultural and political awareness among Chinese youths. The Kuomintang Youth League now has numerous chapters spread throughout the sovereign lands of the Republic of China (Taiwan) and its extensive overseas network include many cities in the United States.

History 

It was preceded by the Three Principles of the People Youth League (三民主義青年團) which existed from 1938 to 1947.

The Kuomintang Youth League was established in 2006 by Kuomintang Chairman Ma Ying-jeou. The primary goal of the Kuomintang Youth League is to serve the Republic of China and local communities. Because many youths are frustrated with the political situation of the Republic of China, the Kuomintang Youth League hopes to use young people's passion for politics to contribute to society. In addition to passionate youths, the Kuomintang Youth League hopes to regain the trust of apathetic youths. Since charges of corruption against Chen Shui-bian surfaced in 2006, many youths have lost faith in politicians and try to avoid the topic altogether. Hoping to regain the support of youths in politics, the Kuomintang developed the Youth League to help bring political awareness to students.

Purpose 
There are over 1 million youths between the ages of 20 and 29 living in Taiwan.

To help youths become better citizens, the Kuomintang hopes more young people will go to their local polling places and vote no matter who they vote for, KMT or DPP. As citizens of one of the few truly democratic nations in Asia, youths should fulfill their obligation and cast their votes. The Kuomintang Youth League not only raises political awareness but encourages its members to be good citizens and exercise their democratic rights. The Kuomintang Youth League also promotes community service whether the Youth League chapter is located in the Republic of China or abroad. The KMT Young League is somewhat different from the mainstream KMT. They however do not strongly support Chinese unification, and liberal views of social issues, such as LGBT rights in Taiwan.

Overseas Extensions 
The Kuomintang Youth League has a broad support group in the United States and Canada, especially in California. Local communities place this youth political organisation very high regard for their community service activities. The first overseas branch was formed in Los Angeles. The newest overseas addition of the Kuomintang Youth League is established in Victoria, British Columbia.

List of leaders

References

See also
Communist Youth League of China

Kuomintang
Youth organizations based in Taiwan
Political organizations based in Taiwan
Organizations based in Taipei
Youth wings of conservative parties
2006 establishments in Taiwan
Youth organizations established in 2006
Youth wings of political parties in China